The Hapuawai River is a short river in the Far North District of New Zealand. It joins the Takou River shortly before its mouth in Takou Bay in the South Pacific Ocean.

See also
List of rivers of New Zealand

References

Land Information New Zealand - Search for Place Names

Far North District
Rivers of the Northland Region
Rivers of New Zealand